The 1999–2000 season was the 57th season in the existence of Nantes Atlantique and the club's 38th consecutive season in the top flight of French football.

Season summary
Nantes Atlantique competed in the French Division 1, the Coupe de France, Coupe de la Ligue, Trophée des Champions, and the UEFA Cup. Nantes Atlantique entered the season as reigning Coupe de France winners, having defeated Sedan in the final in May 1999. Despite struggling in the league and only finishing one point above the relegation zone, the 1999–2000 season would prove to be one of the most successful campaigns in club history, winning both the Coupe de France and Trophée des Champions.

The Coupe de France final is noteworthy as Nantes Atlantique's opponents, Calais, became the first amateur club to reach the final. Nantes would prevail with a 90th-minute penalty converted by top scorer Antoine Sibierski after a back and forth match. Calais' cup run was voted as the best of all time by France Football magazine readers in 2017 and the club went through bankruptcy and liquidation later that same year.

Competitions

French Division 1

League table

Results summary

Results by round

Coupe de France

Coupe de la Ligue

Trophée des Champions

UEFA Cup

First round

Second round

Third round

References

FC Nantes seasons
Nantes